Zhusheng Bridge is a large stone arch bridge in Zhenyuan County, Guizhou, China. The bridge over the Wu River. A Chinese pavilion named "Zhuangyuan Pavilion" or "Kuixing Pavilion" on the bridge.

History
Zhusheng Bridge was originally built in the Hongwu period (1368–1398) of the Ming dynasty (1368–1644). At that time it bore the name "Stream Bridge". It has been repaired several times due to floods. The present version was completed in 1723, in the 1st year of Yongzheng era (1723–1735) of the Qing dynasty (1644–1911). 

In 1988, it was listed among the third group of "Major National Historical and Cultural Sites in Guizhou" by the State Council of China as a part of Qinglongdong Ancient Architectural Complex.

References

Bibliography

Stone bridges in China
Arch bridges in China
Bridges in Guizhou
Ming dynasty architecture
Qing dynasty architecture